Mogens Wieth (16 September 1919 – 10 September 1962) was a Danish film actor. He appeared in more than 20 films between 1940 and 1962. He was born in Copenhagen, Denmark to stage and film actors Carlo Wieth and Agnes Thorberg Wieth, and he died in London, England in 1962.

Selected filmography

 Flådens blå matroser (1937) - Radiotelegrafist på lystyachten
 The Child (1940) - Pontus
 Come Home with Me (1941) - Tømrer Asmus Asmussen
 Regnen holdt op (1942) - Ung mand
 Natekspressen P903 (1942) - Kriminalassistent Otto Warholt
 En herre i kjole og hvidt (1942) - Erik Rask
 Jeg mødte en morder (1943) - Gårdejer Henrik Nielsen
 Drama på slottet (1943) - Kammerjunker Frederich von Kötschau
 Mit liv er musik (1944) - Erik Smith
 Den usynlige hær (1945) - Poul 
 Ditte, Child of Man (1946) - Fortælleren
 The Swedenhielm Family (1947) - Løjtnant Bo Swedenhielm
 Hatten er sat (1947) - Allan Moller
 Mens porten var lukket (1948) - Torsten Haugnæs
 Kampen mod uretten (1949) - Peter Sabroe
 For frihed og ret (1949) - Orla Leehmann
 Aila, Pohjolan tytär (1951) - Harm, American writer
 The Tales of Hoffmann (1951) - Crespel
 24 timer (1951) - Hugo Strand
 Som sendt fra himlen (1951) - Allan / Alfred Kragh
 Arthurs forbrytelse (1955) - Akim Taroff
 The Man Who Knew Too Much (1956) - Ambassador
 Tante Tut fra Paris (1956) - Claus Hiller
 Ingen tid til kærtegn (1957) - Himself
 A Matter of Morals (1961) - Erik Walderman
 Gøngehøvdingen (1961) - Frederik III
 Private Potter (1962) - Yannis (final film role)

References

External links

1919 births
1962 deaths
Danish male film actors
Male actors from Copenhagen
Best Actor Bodil Award winners
20th-century Danish male actors